The Gaziantep Stadium, known for sponsorship reasons as the Kalyon Stadium, is a stadium in Gaziantep, Turkey. It has a capacity of 35,574 spectators. and was opened on 15 January 2017. It is the home ground of Gaziantep F.K., replacing Gaziantep Kamil Ocak Stadium. Its distance to the city centre is 10 kilometers. For it to reflect the tradition of the ancient city of Zeugma, the outside walls of the stadium are covered with mosaic.

Matches

Turkish National Team

Gaziantep Stadium is one of the main home stadiums of the Turkish national Football team

References

Football venues in Turkey
Sport in Gaziantep
Sports venues completed in 2017
2017 establishments in Turkey